Karthika is a 1968 Indian Malayalam film, directed by M. Krishnan Nair and produced by V. M. Sreenivasan and A. R. Divakar. The film stars Sathyan, Sharada, Adoor Bhasi, Ummar and Manavalan Joseph in the lead roles. The film had musical score by M. S. Baburaj.

Cast
 Sarada as Kaarthika
 Sathyan
 K. P. Ummer
 Prem Nawas
 Mallika Sukumaran as Devaki
 Usharani as Janu
 Meena

Soundtrack
The music was composed by M. S. Baburaj and the lyrics were written by Yusufali Kechery.

References

External links
 

1968 films
1960s Malayalam-language films
Films scored by M. S. Baburaj
Films directed by M. Krishnan Nair